KAZT-TV (channel 7) is an independent television station licensed to Prescott, Arizona, United States, serving the Phoenix television market. Owned by the Londen family of Phoenix, it is the only locally owned commercial English-language television station in the Phoenix market. KAZT's studios are located on Tower Road in Prescott, with a secondary studio and sales office in the Londen Center on Camelback Road in Phoenix. Its main transmitter is located atop Mingus Mountain (northeast of Prescott). Its signal is relayed through a network of five low-power translators across central and northern Arizona, including Class A station KAZT-CD (UHF channel 36, also remapped to virtual channel 7) in Phoenix. The station is also carried on cable providers throughout the Phoenix market, as well as on the Phoenix DirecTV and Dish Network local feeds.

History
William H. Sauro obtained a construction permit on January 7, 1980, for a new channel 7 TV station to serve Prescott. The permit briefly carried the KNAZ call letters; during this time, Sauro sought a network affiliation for the new outlet and was ultimately denied by ABC. On September 29, 1980, the call letters were changed to KUSK (the KNAZ call letters were assigned to a station in Flagstaff the following year). Ground was broken on the station's Prescott studios in November 1981, by which time Sauro's plans had dramatically changed, proposing the "Neighborhood Television" network of more than 140 low-power translators in major markets across the country to air KUSK's programming.

KUSK first signed on the air on September 5, 1982. It initially produced local news and sports programming for northern Arizona, but those programs were cut back in a 1985 wave of layoffs. By the 1990s, channel 7 was running low-budget programming that mainly targeted northern Arizona, through its main transmitter transmitting from Mingus Mountain and a network of translators from Yuma to Payson, and from Casa Grande to Bullhead City. The station broadcast television series from the 1950s and old public domain movies (some of which were provided by America One and the American Independent Network), syndicated programs that were declined by other Phoenix stations, local talk shows, and home shopping programs from America's Store. Before the Arizona Diamondbacks began play in 1998, KUSK thrived on Major League Baseball telecasts, and aired San Diego Padres, Oakland Athletics and San Francisco Giants games.

It took years for KUSK to gain market-wide cable coverage. In 1993, it finally succeeded in reaching a deal with Dimension Cable (now Cox Communications), the largest cable provider in the market; however, it was only added to rebuilt areas of the cable system, which was not complete until 1996.

On December 5, 1997, KUSK, Inc., filed for Chapter 11 bankruptcy, while the company reorganized. KUSK emerged from bankruptcy in May 2000 and reached a $6.8 million deal later that year to sell the station to Harry Pappas, who would have relaunched KUSK as an Azteca América affiliate. Money problems, however, forced delays in the launch and scuttled most of the network's planned purchases and affiliate switches.

On November 30, 2001, KUSK reached an agreement to sell the station to the Londen family, who own Lincoln Heritage Life Insurance Company. The new owners installed Ron Bergamo—formerly of KSAZ-TV and later KWBA-TV in Tucson—as general manager to help professionalize the operation. They officially took control of KUSK and its translator network on April 1, 2002. The day after the Londen Group closed on its purchase, it relaunched the station with new call letters: KAZT-TV. It also adopted a new brand, AZ-TV, and a new slogan, "Arizona's Own." They also gave the station a significant technical facelift, including a studio in Phoenix, and purchased stronger programming. The station transformed from a low-budget operation focused on Northern Arizona into a high-quality independent station targeting all of the Phoenix market. It aimed to be a serious competitor to the Valley's long-successful independent, KTVK (channel 3). To help ensure that KAZT would "do some good for Arizona", the Londen family put together an advisory board of notable Arizonans, including Governor Jane Dee Hull, U.S. Representative Bob Stump, prominent local auto dealer Lou Grubb, Jerry Colangelo of the Phoenix Suns and Arizona Diamondbacks, and Michael Bidwill of the Arizona Cardinals. Company patriarch Jack Londen later said that he had bought the station as a 50th anniversary gift for his wife, Dodie.

KAZT-CD
KUSK's Phoenix repeater received a construction permit on January 22, 1985. Originally assigned the call sign K27AN, it was granted to the Meredith Corporation, owners of KPHO-TV (channel 5). In August 1985, before the station was ever built, Meredith sold the permit to Arizona Metro Television Ltd., who constructed the station, then sold it to KUSK, Inc. in April 1986. On the 22nd of the month, the station signed on the air under Program Test Authority, but was not licensed until June 30, 1987. In 1992, channel 27 was switched to air the Home Shopping Network (HSN); KUSK programming moved to the channel 17 and 55 translators.

As part of KUSK's network of stations, KHSK-LP and K55EH were included in the proposed sale to Harry Pappas for his Azteca Phoenix enterprise, but they were eventually sold to the Londen Group as part of the KUSK sale after the Pappas purchase failed to materialize. KHSK-LP initially kept its HSN affiliation, but on July 5, 2002, the Londen Group changed the station's callsign to KAZT-CA and relaunched the station as a translator of KAZT-TV. K55EH eventually became defunct.

After KUTP (channel 45) signed on its digital signal on channel 26, its permanent allocation, KAZT-CA began to experience adjacent channel signal interference. The station requested Special Temporary Authority (STA) to shut off its analog signal and begin operating its digital signal on the same channel (called a "flash cut"). The Federal Communications Commission (FCC) granted the STA on August 16, 2007, and KAZT-CA began broadcasting in digital on January 15, 2008. On August 4, 2008, KAZT-CA applied to move its signal to channel 36, citing displacement due to continuing interference from KUTP. The FCC granted the displacement application on September 10, 2009, and on December 7, KAZT-CA ended broadcasts on channel 27, commencing operations on channel 36 five days later.

Programming

Local and syndicated programming
On weekdays, KAZT-TV airs locally produced live talk shows, including Arizona Daily Mix, co-hosted by former KPHO-TV anchor Catherine Anaya and Danielle Williams, produced in Phoenix, and Sandy and Friends, hosted by Sandy Moss in Prescott.

Syndicated programs currently on KAZT (as of November 2020) include The Doctors, Rachael Ray, Access Hollywood (and its live counterpart), Family Feud, Personal Injury Court, Justice for All with Judge Cristina Perez, Judge Jerry, The Steve Wilkos Show, Maury and Who Wants to Be a Millionaire. Saturday programming features repeats of select weekday programs, as well as a current-events show hosted by KFYI radio personality Mike Broomhead. Sundays are devoted to locally produced shows (including an early morning replay of Broomhead's show after an airing of the syndicated Full Measure with Sharyl Attkisson), infomercials and religious programs including a live broadcast of the Catholic Mass from Cathedral of Saints Simon and Jude in Phoenix.

In the 1990s, KUSK aired a talk show hosted by Sam Steiger.

Sports programming
After the Londens relaunched channel 7 as KAZT-TV, the station acquired a heavy amount of sports programming. It served as the television home of Arizona State University men's and women's basketball, baseball, and softball; Phoenix Mercury WNBA basketball, and Mountain West Conference college football telecasts. In 2003 and 2004, the station also televised preseason football games from the NFL's Arizona Cardinals. From 2006 to 2008, KAZT was the broadcast television home of the NHL's Phoenix Coyotes. On February 17, 2010, the station acquired the rights to broadcast eight games from the Arizona Rattlers of the revived Arena Football League. On January 10, 2015, AZ-TV entered into a partnership with Cox Communications to simulcast five Grand Canyon University Antelopes basketball games that are produced by Cox7 Arizona.

Technical information

Subchannels
The station's digital signal is multiplexed:

On October 13, 2008, KAZT-DT and KAZT-CA launched a subchannel featuring programming from the Retro Television Network (RTV). On June 20, 2011, KAZT added MeTV to digital subchannel 7.3. On August 1, 2011, MeTV was moved to subchannel 7.2 with RTV moving to 7.3. MeTV also shares the affiliation with Kingman-licensed KMOH-TV on channel 6. On September 17, 2012, RTV programming on 7.3 was replaced by the Home Shopping Network. On August 17, 2017, a fourth subchannel was added featuring programming from Charge!

Analog-to-digital conversion
On February 22, 2001, the station was granted a construction permit to build its digital companion channel on UHF channel 25, and in October 2002, after receiving a grant of Special Temporary Authority (STA) to operate at roughly the same service level as its analog station, KAZT-DT came on the air. The station made its temporary operations permanent in August 2006, and on October 17, 2006, it was licensed. KAZT-TV shut down its analog signal, over VHF channel 7, on May 15, 2009. The station's digital signal moved from UHF channel 25 to VHF channel 7. On that date, the station surrendered the license for its channel 25 digital signal to the Federal Communications Commission.

Translators

Low-power translators have had a key role in KAZT's history, particularly its ability to reach viewers in Phoenix.

K27AN (today KAZT-CD) in Phoenix signed on April 22, 1986. Sauro obtained two further translators, K55EH from Shaw Butte and K17BU on Usery Mountain, and signed them on, creating a "synthetic full-power station" with the ability to target advertising to smaller sections of the Phoenix metropolitan area.

In 1992, K27AN was converted to run home shopping programming, with KUSK broadcasting through channels 17 and 55. That October brought a translator in Flagstaff, K30DT on channel 30.

KAZT also held construction permits for another two translators, channel 43 in Casa Grande and channel 19 in Yuma. The Yuma translator was the last to come on air, beginning broadcasts in 1995; within a year, Yuma viewers accounted for 10 percent of KUSK's audience. At its height, KAZT was seen on eight translators: two in the Phoenix metro; the three in Casa Grande, Flagstaff and Yuma; and three translators in Mohave County.

The channel 17 translator moved to channel 57 when KPHO-TV's digital signal was assigned to that channel. Channels 55 and 57 were then replaced by channel 27 in 2002, shortly after Londen took over.

K19CX in Yuma formerly served the Yuma–El Centro market, but was required to drop KAZT programming on December 4, 2006, due to syndication exclusivity issues with other stations within that market and the increasing prevalence of syndicated fare on KAZT's schedule. It became a repeater of KAET (channel 8) and was sold directly to Arizona State University in 2013.

References

External links
 

AZT-TV
Prescott, Arizona
Television channels and stations established in 1982
1982 establishments in Arizona
MeTV affiliates
Charge! (TV network) affiliates
Companies that filed for Chapter 11 bankruptcy in 1997
National Hockey League over-the-air television broadcasters